Owen Zinko (10 April 1945 – 19 August 1996) was an Australian rules footballer who played with Melbourne in the Victorian Football League (VFL).

References

Holmesby, Russell & Main, Jim (2007). The Encyclopedia of AFL Footballers. 7th ed. Melbourne: Bas Publishing.

External links

DemonWiki profile

1945 births
1996 deaths
Australian rules footballers from Victoria (Australia)
Melbourne Football Club players
People from Sale, Victoria